The 2019–20 CAA men's basketball season will mark the 35th season of Colonial Athletic Association basketball, taking place between November 2019 and March 2020.  Practices will commence in October 2019, and the season will end with the 2020 CAA men's basketball tournament.

Head coaches

Coaching changes 
On March 13, 2019, William & Mary announced that head coach Tony Shaver would not be retained for the following season.  On April 2, 2019, William & Mary announced that Dane Fischer was hired to replace Tony Shaver as head coach.
Elon fired head coach Matt Matheny on March 18, 2019, following two consecutive losing seasons.  On April 5, 2019, Elon announced the hiring of Mike Schrage as head men's basketball coach.

Coaches 

Notes:
 All records, appearances, titles, etc. are from time with current school only.
 Year at school includes 2019–20 season.
 Overall and CAA records are from time at current school and are through the end of the 2018–19 season.

Preseason

Preseason poll 

Source

() first place votes

Preseason All-Conference Teams 
Source

Colonial Athletic Association Preseason Player of the Year: Grant Riller (Charleston)

Regular season

Rankings

Conference matrix 
This table summarizes the head-to-head results between teams in conference play.

Postseason

Colonial Athletic Association tournament 

  March 7–10, 2020: Colonial Athletic Association Men's Basketball Tournament, St. Elizabeths East Entertainment and Sports Arena, Washington, D.C.

NCAA tournament 

The CAA had one confirmed bid to the 2020 NCAA Division I men's basketball tournament, that being the automatic bid of Hofstra by winning the conference tournament.  The tournament was cancelled before any other at-large bids were awarded.

National Invitation tournament 

The 2020 National Invitation Tournament was canceled due to the COVID-19 pandemic.

College Basketball Invitational 

The 2020 College Basketball Invitational was canceled due to the COVID-19 pandemic.

CollegeInsider.com Postseason tournament 

The 2020 CollegeInsider.com Postseason Tournament was canceled due to the COVID-19 pandemic.

Awards and honors

Regular season

CAA Player-of-the-Week

 Nov. 11 – Jordan Roland (Northeastern)
 Nov. 18 – Andy Van Vliet (William & Mary)
 Nov. 25 – Desure Buie (Hofstra)
 Dec. 2  – Nathan Knight (William & Mary), Justyn Mutts (Delaware)
 Dec. 9  – Nathan Knight (William & Mary)(2)
 Dec. 16 – Nate Darling (Delaware), Brian Fobbs (Towson)
 Dec. 23 – Eli Pemberton (Hofstra)
 Dec. 31 – Desure Buie (Hofstra)(2)
 Jan. 6  – Nathan Knight (William & Mary)(3), Grant Riller (Charleston)
 Jan. 13 – Allen Betrand (Towson)
 Jan. 20 – Camren Wynter (Drexel)
 Jan. 27 – Nate Darling (Delaware)(2)
 Feb. 3  – Desure Buie (Hofstra)(3), Grant Riller (Charleston)(2)
 Feb. 10 – Nate Darling (Delaware)(3), Marcus Sheffield II (Elon)
 Feb. 17 – Nathan Knight (William & Mary)(4)
 Feb. 24 – Desure Buie (Hofstra)(4)
 Mar. 3  – Brian Fobbs (Towson)(2)

CAA Rookie-of-the-Week

 Nov. 11 – Tyson Walker (Northeastern)
 Nov. 18 – Julien Wooden (James Madison)
 Nov. 25 – Tyson Walker (Northeastern)(2)
 Dec. 2  – Michael Christmas (James Madison)
 Dec. 9  – Hunter Woods (Elon)
 Dec. 16 – Hunter McIntosh (Elon)
 Dec. 23 – Shykeim Phillips (UNCW)
 Dec. 31 – Tyson Walker (Northeastern)(3)
 Jan. 6  – Tyson Walker (Northeastern)(4)
 Jan. 13 – Zac Ervin (Elon)
 Jan. 20 – Shykeim Phillips (UNCW)(2)
 Jan. 27 – Jason Gibson (Towson)
 Feb. 3  – Hunter McIntosh (Elon)(2)
 Feb. 10 – Imajae Dodd (UNCW)
 Feb. 17 – Hunter McIntosh (Elon)(3)
 Feb. 24 – Hunter McIntosh (Elon)(4)
 Mar. 3  – Shykeim Phillips (UNCW)(3)

Postseason

CAA All-Conference Teams and Awards

Attendance

References